Lex is an unincorporated community in McDowell County, West Virginia, United States.

Elexious "Lex" Evans, an early postmaster, gave the community his name.

References

Unincorporated communities in McDowell County, West Virginia
Unincorporated communities in West Virginia
Coal towns in West Virginia